William Elting Johnson (October 17, 1837 in West Town, Orange County, New York – December 16, 1912 in Waverly, Tioga County, New York) was an American physician and politician from New York.

Life
Johnson was the son of Alexander T. Johnson (1811–1898) and Jane (Cuddeback) Johnson (1811–1904). He attended the common schools. He graduated from Albany Medical College in 1859, and practiced medicine in Waverly. During the American Civil War he was an army surgeon from 1862 to 1865 with the 109th New York Volunteers. Afterwards, he resumed the practice of medicine in Waverly. On May 1, 1873, he married Mattie Maria Fuller (1847–1914), and they had one daughter.

Johnson was a presidential elector in 1888, voting for Benjamin Harrison and Levi P. Morton; and a member of the New York State Senate (38th D.) from 1896 to 1900, sitting in the 119th, 120th, 121st, 122nd and 123rd New York State Legislatures.

He died on December 16, 1912, at his home in Waverly, of pneumonia.

Sources
 The New York Red Book compiled by Edgar L. Murlin (published by James B. Lyon, Albany NY, 1897; pg. 153f and 404)
 Cuddeback genealogy
 Bio transcribed from Our County and Its People: A Memorial History of Tioga County, NY by Leroy W. Kingman

1837 births
1912 deaths
Republican Party New York (state) state senators
People from Port Jervis, New York
People from Waverly, Tioga County, New York
Albany Medical College alumni
1888 United States presidential electors
Deaths from pneumonia in New York (state)
19th-century American politicians